is a Japanese chemist specializing in chemoinformatics and data-driven chemistry, a Professor Emeritus at University of Tokyo, and the research director of the Data Science Center at Nara Institute of Science and Technology.

Biography 
He graduated from Kagoshima Prefectural Konan High School in 1974 and from Department of Chemistry, School of Science, Kyushu University in 1978. He completed Department of Chemistry, Graduate School of Science, Kyushu University and obtained a doctorate in science in 1983. After he served as an Associate Professor at Toyohashi University of Technology, he became a Professor at Department of Chemical System Engineering, School of Engineering, University of Tokyo in 2004. He concurrently holds the posts of a Professor and the research director of the Data Science Center at Nara Institute of Science and Technology from 2017. He was also invited as visiting professor at University of Strasbourg in France in 2011.

The Division of Chemical Information of the American Chemical Society gave him the Herman Skolnik Award in 2019 for his contributions to structure elucidation, de novo structure generation and applications of cheminformatics methods to materials design and chemical process control. In 2021, he retired from University of Tokyo at mandatory age and was given the title of Professor Emeritus.

References 

1955 births
Living people
Japanese chemists
20th-century Japanese chemists
21st-century Japanese chemists
Cheminformatics
Academic staff of the University of Tokyo
Academic staff of Nara Institute of Science and Technology
Kyushu University alumni